Brienz BRB railway station is a railway station in the municipality of Brienz, in the Swiss canton of Bern. It is the lower terminus of the Brienz–Rothorn rack railway (BRB) that climbs to the summit of the Brienzer Rothorn mountain.

Connections are also available to local bus network provided by PostBus Switzerland, and shipping services operated by the BLS AG on Lake Brienz at an adjacent quay. Amongst other destinations, buses link to the Ballenberg open-air museum, whilst boats link to the lower station of the Giessbach Funicular, which gives access to the Giessbach Falls.

The station opened in 1892, four years after the Jura–Bern–Lucerne Railway opened Brienz railway station.

Services 
The following services stop at Brienz BRB:

References

External links 
 
 

Railway stations in Switzerland opened in 1892
Railway stations in the canton of Bern
Brienz